The 1988–89 Bundesliga was the 26th season of the Bundesliga, the premier football league in West Germany. It began on 22 July 1988 and ended on 17 June 1989. SV Werder Bremen were the defending champions.

Competition modus
Every team played two games against each other team, one at home and one away. Teams received two points for a win and one point for a draw. If two or more teams were tied on points, places were determined by goal difference and, if still tied, by goals scored. The team with the most points were crowned champions while the two teams with the fewest points were relegated to 2. Bundesliga. The third-to-last team had to compete in a two-legged relegation/promotion play-off against the third-placed team from 2. Bundesliga.

Team changes to 1987–88
FC Homburg and FC Schalke 04 were directly relegated to the 2. Bundesliga after finishing in the last two places. They were replaced by FC St. Pauli and Stuttgarter Kickers. Relegation/promotion play-off participant SV Waldhof Mannheim won the penalty shootout of a decisive third match, which had become necessary after the regular two-legged series ended in an aggregated tie, against SV Darmstadt 98 and thus retained their Bundesliga status.

Team overview

 Waldhof Mannheim played their matches in nearby Ludwigshafen because their own ground did not fulfil Bundesliga requirements.

League table

Results

Relegation play-offs
Eintracht Frankfurt and third-placed 2. Bundesliga team 1. FC Saarbrücken had to compete in a two-legged relegation/promotion play-off. Frankfurt won 3–2 on aggregate and retained their Bundesliga status.

Top goalscorers
17 goals
  Thomas Allofs (1. FC Köln)
  Roland Wohlfarth (FC Bayern Munich)

15 goals
  Uwe Bein (Hamburger SV)

13 goals
  Hans-Jörg Criens (Borussia Mönchengladbach)
  Jürgen Klinsmann (VfB Stuttgart)
  Harald Kohr (1. FC Kaiserslautern)
  Stefan Kuntz (Bayer 05 Uerdingen)
  Uwe Leifeld (VfL Bochum)
  Frank Neubarth (SV Werder Bremen)
  Karl-Heinz Riedle (SV Werder Bremen)
  Fritz Walter (VfB Stuttgart)
  Jürgen Wegmann (FC Bayern Munich)

Champion squad

See also
 1988–89 2. Bundesliga
 1988–89 DFB-Pokal

References

External links
 DFB Bundesliga archive 1988/1989

Bundesliga seasons
1
Germany